Joan J. Huffman (born August 17, 1956) is an American politician serving as a Republican member of the Texas Senate who represents District 17, which includes a portion of populous Harris County.

On the last day of the 86th Legislature, she was chosen by her colleagues—Democrats and Republicans—to serve as president pro tempore.

Background

A native of Houston, Huffman holds a Bachelor of Arts degree from Louisiana State University in Baton Rouge and a Juris Doctor degree from the South Texas College of Law in Houston. Prior to her Senate tenure, Huffman was judge of  the 183rd Criminal District Court in Harris County. Prior to the judgeship she was chief felony prosecutor for the Harris County District Attorney's office.

Political career

In Jan. 2022 Sen. Huffman was named by the Lt.Gov. as the chairwoman of the Senate Finance Committee. She was previously the chair of the State Affairs Committee, Vice Chairwoman of the Senate Committee on Criminal Justice, and a member of the Legislative Budget Board.

She was characterized in 2013 as "the worst" Texas Senator by Texas Monthly magazine. She was again included on the Texas Monthly list of worst Texas legislators in 2015, for, among other things, sponsoring an amendment to a bill that would "exclude from personal financial disclosure the holdings of legislators' spouses." Her husband, Keith Lawyer, a Houston nightclub owner, had loaned Huffman $500,000 for the 2008 campaign. 
 
Huffman won easy re-nomination to the state Senate in the Republican primary held on March 4, 2014. She defeated her only primary opponent, Derek A. Anthony, 32,962 (81.1 percent) to 7,691 (18.9 percent). She then won the general election on November 4, 2014, beating Democratic candidate Rita Lucido 113,817 (63.34%) to 60,934 (33.91%).

In March 2015, Huffman proposed greater protection against libel for journalists who report whistleblower claims which turn out to have been false but which the reporters believed accurate at the time of media release. Huffman's plan died in her State Affairs Committee.

Despite a strong "blue wave" in Harris County, Huffman won reelection on November 6, 2018, when she defeated her Democratic challenger, Rita Lucido, who had also been her 2014 opponent. Huffman polled 157,910 votes (51.5 percent) to Lucido's 143,465 (46.8 percent). Lucido drew nearly 83,000 more votes in 2018 than she had in 2014. Another 5,380 ballots (1.8 percent) went to the 2018 Libertarian Party choice, Lauren LaCount.

In 2021, Huffman created heavily pro-Republican gerrymandered redistricting maps. The maps vastly expanded the number of safe Republican districts, while failing to add districts where non-whites were a majority despite the fact that 90% of the population growth in Texas was non-white.

References

External links

|-

1956 births
21st-century American politicians
Living people
Louisiana State University alumni
People from Houston
Presidents pro tempore of the Texas Senate
Republican Party Texas state senators
South Texas College of Law alumni
Texas lawyers
Texas state court judges